Mark Wesley Thomas Lomenda (Born April 14, 1954) is a Canadian former professional ice hockey forward. He played 164 games in the World Hockey Association with the Chicago Cougars, Denver Spurs, Ottawa Civics and Indianapolis Racers.

External links
 

1954 births
Living people
Canadian ice hockey forwards
Chicago Cougars draft picks
Chicago Cougars players
Denver Spurs (WHA) players
Kansas City Scouts draft picks
Indianapolis Racers players
Long Island Cougars players
Ottawa Civics players
Tucson Rustlers players
Victoria Cougars (WHL) players
NCAA men's ice hockey national champions